The 2000 Texas Longhorns football team represented the University of Texas at Austin during the 2000 NCAA Division I-A football season. They were represented in the Big 12 Conference in the South Division. They played their home games at Darrell K Royal–Texas Memorial Stadium in Austin, Texas. The team was coached by head coach Mack Brown.

Schedule
Texas finished with a 7–1 record in conference play, Mack Brown's best conference record yet. Their only conference loss came to Oklahoma, which was both conference and national champion. The Longhorns finished the regular season with a 9–2 record and were defeated by #8 Oregon in the 2000 Holiday Bowl, 35–30.

Source:

Roster

Rankings

References

Texas
Texas Longhorns football seasons
Texas Longhorns football